Octet  may refer to:

Music
 Octet (music), ensemble consisting of eight instruments or voices, or composition written for such an ensemble
 String octet, a piece of music written for eight string instruments
 Octet (Mendelssohn), 1825 composition by Felix Mendelssohn
 Octet (Bruch), 1920 composition by Max Bruch
 Octet (Beethoven), 1793 composition by Ludwig van Beethoven
 Octet (Lachner), 1850 composition by Franz Lachner
 Octet (Reich), 1979 composition by Steve Reich
 Octet (Reinecke),1892 composition by Carl Reinicke
 Octet (Schubert), 1824 composition by Franz Schubert
 Octet (Stravinsky), 1923 composition by Igor Stravinsky
 Violin octet, a family of stringed instruments
 Octet (musical), a musical by Dave Malloy

Ballet
 Octet (Christensen), 1958 ballet by Willam Christensen
 Octet (Martins), 2003 ballet by Peter Martins

Science and technology
 Octet (computing), a grouping of eight bits
 Byte, a unit of digital information that most commonly consists of eight bits
 Octet stream, alternative name for byte stream
 Octet rule, chemical theory stating that atoms tend to combine so they each have eight valence electrons
 Octet truss, type of space frame

See also
 8 (disambiguation)
 Eightfold Way (physics), theory organizing subatomic baryons and mesons into octets
 Octal, base-8 number system
 Octave (poetry)
 Octetra, a sculpture by Isamu Noguchi
 Okta, a meteorological unit of measurement of cloud cover in terms of how many eighths of the sky are covered in clouds